The Magnifique class was a type of three 74-gun ships of the line.

 Magnifique
Builder:
Ordered:
Launched: 1750
Fate: 1782, Grounded on sandbar off Lovells Island, Boston, MA, USA

 Entreprenant
Builder:
Ordered:
Launched:
Fate:

 Guerrier
Builder: Toulon
Ordered: 18 September 1750
Launched: 9 September 1753
Fate: Burnt by the British after the Battle of the Nile, 2 August 1798

 
74-gun ship of the line classes
Ship of the line classes from France
Ship classes of the French Navy